Kenneth Oman (born 29 July 1982 in Finglas, Dublin) is an Irish retired footballer who played as a defender.

Career

Oman began his league career at Bohemian when Pete Mahon signed him in the summer of 2001. He made his League of Ireland debut as a substitute in a 5–1 win away to Galway United on 31 August 2001.

The defender was released by Bohemians in the close season between the 2005 and 2006 seasons and was immediately signed by former mentor Stephen Kenny. Oman relocated to Derry in an attempt to secure regular first team football.

He had an impressive competitive debut for the club against Linfield in the 2006 Setanta Cup and also played in Derry City's 2006–07 UEFA Cup games against high quality European opposition.

With the appointment of Pat Fenlon as his team's manager for the 2007 season, Oman was paired with Darren Kelly as Derry City's first choice partnership in central defence. As a result of his performances in the 2007 season, Oman received an unofficial Player of the Season Award from one of Derry City's supporters clubs. On 22 November, Oman was re-signed by Bohemians after he expressed his desire to return home to Dublin.

He struggled to find form on his return to Bohemians and despite winning a League of Ireland winners medal, he found it difficult to displace the central defensive pairing of Jason McGuinness and Liam Burns. He started the 2009 season on the bench but eventually found a first team place as a result of McGuinness being suspended. He scored some important goals during the season, including two against St. Patrick's Athletic on 11 August. He finished the season with two more winners medals as Bohemians reclaimed the league title and defeated Waterford United in the final of the League of Ireland Cup. He was voted onto the PFAI team of the year for 2009.

The following year was an unsuccessful one for Oman and Bohemians. The team lost the league title on goal difference and failed to make an impact in European competition. Bohemians and Oman parted ways after the 2010 season came to an end.

On 10 February 2011, Oman joined Shamrock Rovers. He made his League debut for the Hoops in the opening night win over Dundalk

In December 2012 Oman signed for the 2013 League of Ireland season .

In February 2015, free agent Oman joined NIFL Premiership side Portadown on an 18-Month Contract. In a 0–2 Defeat to Cliftonville Oman came on in the last 20 minutes for Keith O'Hara. Then, Oman as soon as play resumed, threw Clifftonville striker Martin Donnelly to the ground much to the amusement of the home fans. Oman made his first start on 14 March 2015 against Dungannon Swifts and was yellow carded for a challenge on Jamie Glackin.

Honours
League of Ireland: 3
 Bohemian – 2008, 2009
 Shamrock Rovers – 2011
FAI Cup: 2 
 Derry City – 2006
 Bohemian – 2008
League of Ireland Cup: 3
 Derry City – 2006, 2007
 Bohemian – 2009
FAI President's Cup: 1
 St Patrick's Athletic – 2014
Setanta Sports Cup: 3
 Bohemian – 2009-10
 Shamrock Rovers – 2011, 2013
Leinster Senior Cup: 2
 Shamrock Rovers – 2012, 2013

References

External links
 

1982 births
Living people
Republic of Ireland association footballers
Association footballers from County Dublin
Derry City F.C. players
Bohemian F.C. players
Shamrock Rovers F.C. players
St Patrick's Athletic F.C. players
Portadown F.C. players
League of Ireland players
NIFL Premiership players
Association football central defenders
Republic of Ireland under-21 international footballers
League of Ireland XI players
Rivermount Boys F.C. players